The Samavartana, also known as , is a rite of passage in the ancient texts of Hinduism performed at the close of the Brahmacharya period and marked the graduation of the student from Gurukul (school). It signifies a person's readiness to enter grihastashrama (householder, married life).

Description
Samavartana or Snana, is the ceremony associated with the end of formal education and the Brahmacharya asrama of life. This rite of passage includes a ceremonial bath. This ceremony marked the end of school, but did not imply immediate start of married life. Typically, significant time elapsed between exiting the Brahmacharya stage of life and the entering of Grihastha stage of life.

Anyone who had completed this rite of passage was considered a Vidya-snataka (literally, bathed in knowledge, or showered with learning), and symbolized as one who had crossed the ocean of learning.

Ceremony
The ceremony was a gathering of students, teacher and guests. The student asked the teacher for any gift (guru-dakshina) he desired, which if specified was the student's responsibility to deliver over his lifetime. Then, after a recitation by the teacher of a graduate's dharma (snataka-dharma) and a fire ritual, the graduate took a ceremonial bath. The ceremony occurred after completion of at least 12 years of school, that is either about age 21 or later.

[Taittiriya Upanishad] describes, in the eleventh anuvaka of Shiksha Valli, the snataka-dharma recitation emphasized by the teacher to a graduate at this rite of passage. The verses ask the graduate to take care of themselves and pursue Dharma, Artha and Kama to the best of their abilities. Parts of the verses in section 1.11.1, for example, state

The eleventh anuvaka of Shiksha Valli list behavioral guidelines for the graduating students from a gurukul,

The third section of the eleventh anuvaka lists charity and giving, with faith, sympathy, modesty and cheerfulness, as ethical precept for the graduating students at the Samavartana rite of passage.

See also
Saṃskāra - a list of rites of passage in Hinduism
Rites of passage

References

Further reading

 Samavartana, Snāna PV Kane, History of Dharmasastras, pages 407-417

Samskaras